Jhonny Acosta Zamora (born 21 July 1983) is a Costa Rican professional footballer who plays as a defender for the Costa Rica national team.

Club career
Acosta made his professional debut for Santos de Guápiles in the 2004/05 season and left them in 2010 for Alajuelense with whom he won three league titles. In January 2013, he moved abroad to have a six-month loan spell at Mexican second division side Dorados.

On 8 September 2016, Acosta joined Herediano. On 29 November 2017, he renewed his contract for another year. On 10 January, he switched to Colombian club Rionegro Águilas.

East Bengal
He was issued the number 2 jersey. On 2 September, he made his debut for the club and scored a goal in a 2–2 draw against Mohun Bagan in the Kolkata derby at the Salt Lake Stadium in Calcutta Football League. On 16 April 2019, he left the club.

On 26 June 2019, Acosta signed with Costa Rican club UCR. On 6 March 2020, he returned to East Bengal until the end of the season as a replacement for Liberian Ansumana Kromah.

International career
A relatively late newcomer to the national team set-up, Acosta made his debut for Costa Rica in a March 2011 friendly match against Argentina, aged 27. He has represented his country in seven FIFA World Cup qualification matches and played at the 2011 CONCACAF Gold Cup and the 2011 Copa América. On 6 September 2013, he scored his first goal for Los Ticos in a 3–1 2014 FIFA World Cup qualifying victory against the United States in San José.

In June 2014, Acosta was included in Costa Rica's squad for the 2014 FIFA World Cup and made his debut in the competition during the round of 16 match against Greece as a substitute after the sending off of teammate Óscar Duarte. He was in the starting line-up for the quarter-final against the Netherlands, where he helped the team to a clean sheet in a 3–4 penalty shoot-out loss.

In May 2018, Acosta was named in Costa Rica’s 23-man squad for the 2018 FIFA World Cup in Russia. He played the whole of the team's group stage matches against Brazil, Serbia and Switzerland.

Career statistics

International
Statistics accurate as of match played 27 June 2018.

Scores and results list Costa Rica's goal tally first.

References

External links

Profile - LD Alajuelense

1983 births
Living people
People from San Carlos (canton)
Association football defenders
Costa Rican men's footballers
Costa Rican expatriate footballers
Costa Rica international footballers
2011 CONCACAF Gold Cup players
2011 Copa América players
2014 FIFA World Cup players
2014 Copa Centroamericana players
Copa América Centenario players
2017 Copa Centroamericana players
2017 CONCACAF Gold Cup players
2018 FIFA World Cup players
Copa Centroamericana-winning players
Santos de Guápiles footballers
L.D. Alajuelense footballers
Dorados de Sinaloa footballers
Águilas Doradas Rionegro players
C.F. Universidad de Costa Rica footballers
East Bengal Club players
Deportivo Saprissa players
Municipal Pérez Zeledón footballers
I-League players
Liga FPD players
Categoría Primera A players
Costa Rican expatriate sportspeople in India
Costa Rican expatriate sportspeople in Mexico
Costa Rican expatriate sportspeople in Colombia
Expatriate footballers in India
Expatriate footballers in Mexico
Expatriate footballers in Colombia
Calcutta Football League players